Municipal elections were held in the Canadian province of New Brunswick on May 14, 2012. Here is a summary of results in the major communities in the province.

Bathurst

Campbellton

Dieppe

Edmundston

Fredericton

Grand Bay–Westfield

Grand Falls

Maisonnette

Miramichi

Moncton

Oromocto

Quispamsis

Riverview

Rothesay

Sackville

Saint John

Shediac

Woodstock

References

Municipal elections in New Brunswick
2012 elections in Canada
2012 in New Brunswick